An Icelandic driving licence is a permit issued by the Icelandic Ministry of Transport authorizing its holder to operate a motorized vehicle.

Categories 
Iceland uses the same categories as other EEA states, although local laws regarding which vehicles they include may differ slightly from other jurisdictions. Each category covers both manual and automatic gear-shifts.

See also
European driving licence
Vehicle registration plates of Iceland

References

External links

Iceland
Law of Iceland